Jean Terlier (born 2 March 1977) is a French politician of La République En Marche! (LREM) who has been serving as a member of the French National Assembly since the 2017 elections, representing the department of Tarn. He is also one of his parliamentary group's spokespeople.

Political career
In parliament, Terlier serves on the Committee on Legal Affairs. In this capacity, he is the parliament's rapporteur on a 2021 reform of France's juvenile criminal justice. In addition to his committee assignments, he chairs the French-Gabonese Parliamentary Friendship Group.

In July 2019, Terlier voted in favour of the French ratification of the European Union’s Comprehensive Economic and Trade Agreement (CETA) with Canada.

See also
 2017 French legislative election

References

1977 births
Living people
Deputies of the 15th National Assembly of the French Fifth Republic
La République En Marche! politicians
Place of birth missing (living people)